The following people acted as Education Ministers of Nigeria, including Ministers of State for Education:

 Aja Nwachukwu (1958 to 1965)
 Richard Akinjide (1965 to 1967) 
 Wenike Briggs (1967 to 1970)
 A. Y. Eke (1970 to 1975)
 Ahmadu Ali (1975 to 1978)
 G. B. Leton (1978 to 1979)
 Sylvester Ugoh (1979 to 1982)
 Bala Usman (1979 to 1982)
 Elizabeth Iyase (1979 to 1982)
 I. C. Madubuike (1982 to 1983)
 L. A. Bamigbaiye (1982 to 1983)
 Sunday Afolabi (September to December 1983)
 Alhaji Y. Abdullahi (1984 to 1985)
 Alhaji Ibrahim (1985)
 Jubril Aminu (1985 to 1989)
 Babs Fafunwa (1990 to 1992)
 Ben Nwabueze (January 1993 to August 1993) 
 A. I. Imogie (January 1993 to November 1993)
 Alhaji Dongodaji (January 1993 to January 1994)
 Iyorchia Ayu (January 1994 to February 1995)
 Wada Nas (January 1995 to February 1995)
 M. T. Liman (February 1995 to December 1997)
 Iyabo Anisulowo (February 1997 to December 1997)
 Dauda Birmah (December 1997 to June 1998)
 A. N. Achunine (December 1997 to June 1998)
 Olaiya Oni (August 1998 to May 1999)
 Alhaji S. Saadu (August 1998 to May 1999)
 Tunde Adeniran (June 1999 to January 2001)
 Lawam Batagarawa (June 1999 to 2001)
 Babalola Borishade (February 2001 to June 2003)
 Bello Usman (February 2001 to June 2003)
 F. N. C. Osuji (July 2003 to February 2005)
 Hajia Bintu Musa (July 2003 to June 2005)
 Chinwe Obaji (June 2005 to June 2006)
 Halima Tayo Alao (June 2005 to 2006)
 Grace Ogwuche (February 2006 to June 2006)
 Oby Ezekwesili (June 2006 to April 2007)
 Sayadi Abba Ruma (June 2006 to April 2007)
 Adewunmi Abitoye (June 2006 to May 2007)
 Igwe Aja Nwachukwu (June 2007 to December 2008)
 Jerry Agada (June 2007 to December 2008)
 Aishatu Jibril Dukku (June 2007 - 2010)
 Sam Egwu (December 2008 to March 2010)
 Ruqqayat Rufai (April 2010 – September 2013)
 Ibrahim Shekarau (2014 - 2015)
 Adamu Adamu (November 2015 – Present)

See also
Federal Ministry of Education (Nigeria)

References

Education